Herd & McKenzie, later Buckie Shipyard Ltd, were shipbuilders and repairers in Buckie, Moray, Scotland.

History
James Herd & Thomas McKenzie started building boats at the Crooked Hythe in Findochty in 1903. Between 1905 and 1915 they built 32 steam drifters. In 1918, the firm moved from Findochty to a new yard in Buckie, at the eastern end of Cluny Harbour.

Buckie Shipyard were latterly part of the Lithgow Group.

It was announced on 23 August 2013 that the Buckie Shipbuilders had gone into administration with 68 of the 74 staff being made redundant immediately.

Services
Buckie Shipyard built, converted, refitted and repaired ferries, tugs, workboats, yachts, pilot boats, MOD vessels, small cruise vessels, diving vessels, lifeboats, fishing boats and fish farm cages. They slipped vessels up to 850 tonnes in displacement and 70 metres in length. A new 1,600 sq. metres refit facility opened in 2003, including a state-of-the-art temperature and humidity controlled paint spray booth, capable of taking vessels up to 21m in length, 6m in beam and up to 50 tonnes. A 50-ton hydraulic slipway hoist transported vessels directly from the inner basin at Buckie Harbour into the refit hall.

The Royal National Lifeboat Institution had been a major client for over 60 years, with all classes of RNLI lifeboat undergoing refit.

In its last few years the yard delivered two aluminium windfarm service catamarans, Penmon Point and Lynas Point to Turbine Transfers, for work in Belgium and similar vessels followed.

Ships built

Footnotes

References

Economy of Moray
Defunct shipbuilding companies of Scotland
Buckie